Borchgrevink Nunatak is a nunatak  long which rises to , standing at the south side of the entrance to Richthofen Pass, on the east coast of Graham Land. It was discovered in 1902 by the Swedish Antarctic Expedition under Otto Nordenskiöld, who named it for C. E. Borchgrevink, leader of the British Antarctic Expedition, 1898–1900, to Victoria Land.

Further reading

External links 
 Borchgrevink Nunatak on USGS website
 Borchgrevink Nunatak on SCAR website
 Borchgrevink Nunatak area satellite image
 The geology of Oscar II Coast

References 

Nunataks of Graham Land
Oscar II Coast